The following is a list of awards and nominations received by the English actor, theatre director, and playwright Mark Rylance.

Major associations

Academy Awards

BAFTA Awards

Golden Globe Awards

Emmy Awards

Laurence Olivier Awards

Screen Actors Guild Awards

Tony Awards

Other awards and nominations

AACTA International Awards

BBC Radio Times Award

Blank Check Awards

Boston Society of Film Critics

Chicago Film Critics Association

Critics' Choice Awards

Critics' Circle Theatre Awards

Florida Film Critics Circle

Houston Film Critics Society

Independent Spirit Awards

Indiana Film Journalists Association

Kansas City Film Critics Circle

London Film Critics' Circle

National Society of Film Critics

New York Film Critics Circle

New York Film Critics Online

Olivier Critics Award

Online Film Critics Society

Satellite Awards

Toronto Film Critics Association

Vancouver Film Critics Circle

Washington D.C. Area Film Critics Association

References

Rylance, Mark